Grain storage on a subsistence farm is primarily based on minimizing grain loss. In modern agricultural practices there are methods of managing under 1% grain loss, but small subsistence farms can see 20% - 100% of grain loss. This causes starvation and an unstable food supply. Grain loss can be caused by mold growth, bugs, birds, or any other contamination.

One method of preventing loss is hermetic grain storage. Hermetic grain storage strives to eliminate all exchange of gases within the storage system. This mitigates bacterial activity and prevents rodents and bugs from being able to breathe inside the storage systems. The introduction of hermetic grain storage to subsistence farms can create a more stable food supply in the area and reduce the risk of starvation.

Hermetic Grain Storage Systems

Overview 
Hermetic storage is the process of storing grain or seeds inside sealed compartments to avoid gas changes with the environment in order to deplete the oxygen and accumulation of carbon dioxide gas. This combination is lethal to insects and molds, creating an alternative control instead of using any other substance nocive to these pests and maintaining the product quality.
This storage method is an important aspect for enhancing and elongating grain life at the same time maintaining the grain integrity.

Hermetic storage has been around for a long times and it has been received well and largely in developing countries since the inception of the method. The method can exercised using different materials such as sealed clay pots, sealed plastic bags, sealed metals etc. These materials are effective in their own right and cost are variable therefore caution need to be practiced to preclude insects infestation during storage time. The process is of utmost importance. Ideally a successful hermetic storage would mean grains are able to retain all their nutrient quality and crushable commodities are well kept for the entire process of storage. Hypothetically, if ninety five percent (95%) of the grain retains their natural characteristic and quality, therefore, statistically hermetic grain storage would mean its efficient and effective method.

Nonetheless, the method is used worldwide in Africa, Asia and majority parts of America. The scale of acceptance of this method assure its quality in preserving small and large scale farmer's crops. Developing countries are relentless and do not want to be left behind, there are enthusiastically adopting the method in large scales as they have seen the benefits of using this storage process.

Benefits of using the hermetic storage method include (i) enhances grain life in a much safer and it is rodent-free, weevils-free, pesticides-free and prevents infestation of insects, (ii) the storage process is defiant and resistant to harsh conditions (with the exception of extremely harsh conditions i.e. temperature 0 to -20 degrees Celsius, being unfavorable for oil palm seeds storage) such as hot and humid climates, (iii) the mortality of living organisms is kept at 100 percent rate, (iv) precludes mold from developing and (v) mycotoxins which have a high likelihood to cause cancer are totally annihilated. Prior to hermetic storage, grain need to be properly dried to moisture content range of approximately 12 – 14 percent to avoid germination and viability losses. Germination and viability are crucial for crop productions and if losses are encountered then it would mean a loss in profits.

History 
Underground grain storage was one of the main methods to preserve cereal early in the nineteenth century through some southeast European and Asiatic societies using “airtight” underground silos as an alternative for big bottle and jars that was used in the Mediterranean. 
Writing evidence appeared only in the 16th century. By the 1800s, detailed descriptions of the underground silos were made by knowledgeable agricultural writers of Western Europe. They highlighted the airtightness as a major factor to maintain grain quality although some reports observed that some seeds lost germination power.

Early researches with airtight storage were made from 1819 to 1830, where a French industrialist named Ternaux at Saint-Ouen stored grain in 9 series of experiment in large scale in general. Ternaux's stored the product under not so favorable circumstances. The silos were dug into a wet alluvium and the material was stored without caring about the humidity. After several years, only spots of mold was encountered inside the silos, especially in critical areas as the walls, roof, and bottom of the structure. Bread was made with the remaining unspoiled grain but the taste of it was not satisfying; thus, the experiment was considered a failure. However, this can be considered as one of the first made scientific research involving hermetic storage.

Around the world 

The method is heavily used in central, southern parts of Africa (i.e. Botswana) and South America. Small scale farmers have found the process to be more beneficial in their regions. Botswana is an arid area, it can go for longer periods of time without rain and therefore hermetic storage has helped in times without rain i.e. draught. Seeds are well stored for the next season of plowing even though at times seeds are purchase. Usually seeds purchase is done in supplementary measures. In Botswana, traditional people usually use the hermetic storage placed inside a jute bag to increase efficiency and effectiveness in eradicating living organisms within few days. Also, hermetic is crucial in Africa as most of the seeds are produced and stored in the farm. Experimental results proved that hermetic storage of seeds for twelve months can retain germination and viability characteristics, whilst extremely harsh conditions can render an opposite effect.

Brazilian grain producers are starting to use hermetic bags on site to store grains as an alternative to bins. They claim that the cost is accessible and the quality of the grain remains the same for a period of 18 months. The bags are made of polyethylene that are capable of reflect sunlight and avoid the heating of the product as well as degradation by light.
Argentina has to, frequently, deal with a storage shortage of 20 to 35 million tonnes of grain. This led to quality and quantity loss since the grain has to be transported directly from the farms to elevators, and from elevators to terminal ports. Hermetically sealed plastic bags (silo bags) has gained popularity among producers to overcome this issue. In 2008 harvest season, more than 33 million tonnes of grain were stored using the silo bags in the country for several grains and oilseeds, and, now, this technology is being adopted by other South American countries.
Sealed bag has been used to store mostly silage in North America, however, the use of this storage system started to grown since the early 2000s. Still, instead using hermetic choices, the most common option when dealing with storage shortage is piling the grain on the ground.

Types of hermetic storage 

In the advancement of these hermetic storage benefits, three methods are popular used to safely store grain and seeds under hermetic conditions:
 Organic Hermetic storage – This process of storage deprive pesticides and insects infestation of oxygen hence slowing down their metabolic process. In the process insects are allowed a chance to respire for few days in the process oxygen depletion take an effect leading to a total annihilation of the un-invited campers (due to suffocation).
 Vacuum Hermetic Fumigation – In this process air suction takes precedence. Air within the hermetic storage is sucked out leaving little oxygen for living organisms to survive on. Suction of the air creates a low atmospheric pressure which is unfriendly and unconducive for invaders (i.e. insects).
 Gas Hermetic storage – filling the hermetic storage facility with carbon dioxide to expedite oxygen depletion.

The main factor that affects the mortality of insects is the low  and high  concentrations. Studies show that the synergetic effect between oxygen depletion and dioxide carbon gas accumulation is necessary to effectively control insects in a hermetic storage [3]. Also, moisture content plays an important role, the lower the water present in the grain mass, the higher the mortality, due to the desiccation effect on insects by low  and high ,.
All methods described previously are equally applicable because all ensure that oxygen which would otherwise by insects is totally depleted to avoid infestation on stored grain. The most prominent method is the organic hermetic storage.

Postcosecha silos 
Postcosecha silos are galvanized steel silos. Bulk products such as maize, beans, sorghum, rice, wheat, barley, as well as seeds can be stored in silos. Products must be dried to or below 14% moisture content before being placed in silos to prevent fungi growth. These silos are usually built locally with simple tools, making them easy to assemble, and are sold from local craftsman to the locals called artisans. The silo's have a small outlet port at the base of the silo so small amounts of grain can be taken out at a time.

Purdue Improved Cowpea Storage (PICS) System 
A team at Purdue University has developed the Purdue Improved Cowpea Storage and is promoting its use in Western Africa with funds from the Gates Foundation. This method achieves hermetic grain storage by three bags. This method is generally used for storage and transport of cowpeas, hence the name, but the method can be used on other grains. The heavy polyethylene bags with 80-µm thickness come in 50 - kg or 100 - kg. The first polyethylene bag is filled completely and then tied securely. The first bag is then placed into a second polyethylene bag with same thickness and that bag is tied securely as well. Finally, these two bags are placed in a third woven nylon or polypropylene bag used for its strength. In this third bag farmers and markets can handle the bags without bursting the inner two, and are readily accepted by grain handlers.

Recycled plastic containers 
In parts of sub-Saharan Africa markets sell used plastic containers that can be used for hermetic storage. One needs to make sure the containers can hermetically seal or the containers will only provide a minimal protection to the grain inside.

Estimated cost

Final grain quality 
Seeds stored hermetically have shown to exhibit prolonged quality. Researches in Ghana investigated the effectiveness of storing seeds using three different types of grain storage. The three methods used in the research included the jute, polypropylene and triple layer hermetic storage. Two destructive insects pests, Adult Prostephanus truncatus and Sitophilus were infested in each bag. These two insects pests are common in Africa and are very destructive to maize. Unprotected maize in storage can be totally annihilated by these organisms. Of these three methods, the triple layer hermetic storage offered outstanding results of seed quality with prolonged germination rate and viability despite insect infestation. Additionally, to ensure that grain maintains its natural quality in storage, it has to be stored at optimal moisture contents of approximately 12 -14% and preferably low moisture content. The bags have to be sealed for the entire period of storage and regular check ups need to be down to ascertain that the seal remains intact i.e. very air tight bags. Another study investigated the efficacy of controlling bean pests i.e. Acanthoscelides obtectus on the quality of beans by employing the hermetic storage system (silo bags and plastic bottles) and non-hermetic glass containers. Beans were stored at high moisture contents of 15%, temperature 25 C and relative humidity 70± 5%. In the study the hermetic method showed no alteration in quality.
Deterioration in grain quality arises from several factors (1) high moisture content at the time of storage. High grain moisture content promotes development of molds which renders the grains unusable or unsafe for consumption. (2) failure to keep storage bags air tight from oxygen which would otherwise accelerate insect infestation leading to total destruction of grain. In this phenomenon, hermetic conditions are not met to secure the grain from insects. (3) Failure to keep the bags water tight to prevent moisture infiltration, (4) high temperatures leading to grain discoloration and largely insect infestation.

Insect mortality
Longer the exposure of insects to the low  and high  concentration atmosphere, higher the mortality of these pests in the hermetic storage. However, temperature and life stage, also, have influence on this factor to determine how long the grain should be stored. The next table show the time required to kill 90% of insects stored in a low pressure hermetic storage depending on the insect species, life stage, and temperature. The table below shows the exposure time (h) required to obtain 90% mortality of three development stages of three species of store-product insects under low pressure ate four temperatures.

References

Grain production
Simple living